The Bulgarian minnow (Phoxinus strandjae) is a species of freshwater fish in the family Cyprinidae. It is found in the Veleka and Resowska drainages in Bulgaria and Turkey.

References

Phoxinus
Fish described in 1926